Thanjavur Chariot festival  (தஞ்சாவூர் தேர்த்திருவிழா)  is a historical event associated with the Big Temple, Thanjavur, Tamil Nadu, India.

Background
In 2015, the chariot festival was held in the Big Temple, after a gap of more than one hundred years. Since then every year the festival is held in Thanjavur. During the 18th and 19th centuries festival was held. According to a document in 1776 C.E., 20,200 pulled the chariot during the festival in Thanjavur. Serfoji during the chariot festival held 1813 C.E., have brought out 27,394 persons from various taluks such as Thiruvaiyaru (1900), Papanasam (2800), Kumbakonam (3494), Mayuram (3484), Thiruvarur (2920), Mannargudi (4200), Kilvelur (4500), Nannilam (3200), including 900 persons from Thiruvaiyaru for carrying out the vahanas for the festival. In 1801 C.E. the king has donated 500 chakras for renewing the wheels of the chariot. As per the Modi document, 150 chakras was spent, as expenses, for pulling the chariot in 1801 C.E. and 1811 C.E. He set up five big chariots and also built four parking places in four main streets of Thanjavur.

Specialities
The chariot was constructed by more than 30 artisans and sculptors, with 25 tonnes of Iluppai and teakwood. It consisted of three tiers, atop with throne. On the throne, known as simhasana the processional deity was kept. Based on the agamas, the sculptures for the chariot was made of iluppai tree. In the first stage, up to one and half a feet, 40 sculptures were set up. In the second stage up to two and quarter feet, 56 sculptures were set up. After completion of two stages, the final stage took place and trial run was held.  It had 360 wooden sculptures including the sculptures of Periyanayaki, the consort of Shiva, Vinayaka,  Subramania, Dvarapala, Boomadevi, Agasthiar, Sarabamurti, Gnanasambandar, Appar, Sundarar, Manikkavacakar, Veerabadrar, Bhikshatanar, Rishabarudar, Ekabathamoorthy. On four side of the chariot horses and yalis were found. In the front side of the chariot the Kailash, the abode of Siva and in the rear side  Nandhi Mandapa and the Vimana of the Big Temple is sculpted in the same size. It had a height of 16 and half feet and 13 and half feet breadth.

Trial run
After construction of the chariot with the setting up of sculptures in it, the trial run chariot festival was held on 20 April 2015. Before the trial run at 6.30 a.m. special pujas were done to the throne where the processional deity was to be kept. More number of devotees pulled the chariot.

Chariot festival 
On the previous day of the festival, on 28 April 2015, from the Nataraja shrine of the Big Temple procession took place to the accompaniment of melas and nadasvarams. On the festival day, on 29 April 2015  
 the chariot started. At 5.15 a.m. Panchamurtis, the five processional deities such as Vinayaka, Subramania, Thyagaraja with consort, Devi and Chandikesvarar came from the temple premises through Sivagangai Park and reached where the chariot was kept. At 6.15 a.m. all the deities were kept in their respective places. After the conduct of special pujas, thousands of devotees pulled the chaript. Followed by caparisoned elephant the chariots moved. To the front of the main chariot of the presiding deity Thyagaraja and Kamalambal, the small chariots of Vinayaka and Subramania went. Amman chariot and Chandikesvara chariot followed the main chariot. Folk dancers of Thappattam, Kolattam, Mayil Attam and Silambattam and Oduvars singing Devaram accompanied the chariot. In many places the chariots were stopped for the easier view and worship of the devotees and conduct of pujas and cracking of coconuts.
 Every year this festival is being held.

References

Trial run/2015

Festival/2015

External links

 Temple Car Festival Held At Thanjavur For Chithirai Thiruvizha - Thanthi TV, 2015
 Devotees throng Thanjavur for Big Temple Chariot Festival - Thanthi TV, 2016
 Thousands take part in car festival, The Hindu, 6 May 2017
 Chithirai Thiruvizha: Temple Car Festival begins with flag hoisting at Big Temple in Thanjavur Puthiyathalaimurai TV, 2018
 சித்திரை திருவிழா : தஞ்சை பெரிய கோவிலில் கொடியேற்றத்துடன் தொடங்கியது - 16ம் தேதி தேரோட்டம் One India Tamil, 3 April 2019

Hindu festivals
Tamil culture
Thanjavur district
Religious festivals in India